Henry Perronet Briggs RA (1793 – 18 January 1844) was an English painter of portraits and historical scenes.

Life
Briggs was born at Walworth, County Durham, the son of a post office official. His cousin was Amelia Opie (née Alderson), the wife of artist John Opie (whose portrait was later painted by Briggs). While still at school at Epping he sent two engravings to the Gentleman's Magazine and in 1811 entered as a student at the Royal Academy, London, where he began to exhibit in 1814. From that time onwards until his death he was a constant exhibitor at the annual exhibitions of the Academy, as well as the British Institution, his paintings being for the most part historical in subject. After his election as a Royal Academician (RA) in 1832 he devoted his attention almost exclusively to portraiture.

Briggs died, of tuberculosis in London on 18 January 1844, aged 50/51. The lease to his home in Bruton Street, Berkeley Square was subsequently purchased by portrait painter Thomas Henry Illidge.

Jacob Bell, founder of the Pharmaceutical Society, was a cousin of Briggs, and took painting lessons from the artist as a child. Bell commissioned several art-works and it was his connections that enabled Briggs to paint the portraits of pharmacist John Bell (of John Bell & Co.), and William Allen, the Society's first President. Briggs also designed the society's membership certificate. Thomas Francis Dicksee was a notable pupil of Briggs.

Works
Two of Briggs' historical pictures, first exhibited at the Academy in 1826 and 1827, are now in Tate Britain, London – First Conference between the Spaniards and Peruvians, 1531, and Juliet and her Nurse. His large painting of George III presenting the Sword to Lord Howe on board the Queen Charlotte, 1794, was initially purchased by the British Institution, presented to Greenwich Hospital, and is now in the National Maritime Museum. Among the more successful of the various Shakespearean scenes painted by him may be mentioned his Othello relating his adventures to Desdemona. Of his numerous portraits, the best perhaps was that of Lord Eldon. He also made the portrait of the Indian leader Raja Ram Mohan Roy.

William Thackeray regarded Briggs as "out and out the best portrait-painter of the set"; though the Dictionary of National Biography entry (1886), by Warwick William Wroth, was more circumspect, commenting that "the pictures painted by Briggs, though not without merits of construction, cannot be said to belong to the highest class of art".

References

Attribution

External links

 
H P Briggs online (ArtCyclopedia)
A Scene from 'The Adventures of Ferdinand Count Fathom' (1829 oil on panel – Christie's)

19th-century English painters
English male painters
English portrait painters
Royal Academicians
People from the Borough of Darlington
19th-century deaths from tuberculosis
1793 births
1844 deaths
Tuberculosis deaths in England
19th-century English male artists